The Loka Lodge at Raduha is a mountain hostel that stands on the Loka Plateau in northern Slovenia. It is open from the start of June to the end of August.

Starting points
 1h: from the Vodol Pasture
 3h: from the village of Luče
 1¼h: from the Radušnik Farm
 3¼h: from the village of Bistra

Neighbouring hills 
 1¾h : Big Mount Raduha

See also
 Slovenian Mountain Hiking Trail

References
 Slovenska planinska pot, Planinski vodnik, PZS, 2012, Milenko Arnejšek - Prle, Andraž Poljanec

External links
 Routes, Description & Photos

Mountain huts in Slovenia
Kamnik–Savinja Alps